HMS Leviathan was one of four  armoured cruisers built for the Royal Navy around 1900. She was assigned to the China Station upon completion and then served in the Mediterranean Fleet in 1905–06. She was assigned to the 7th Cruiser Squadron in 1907 before she was briefly reduced to reserve. Leviathan was recommissioned in 1909 for service with the 4th Cruiser Squadron before she was placed in reserve in 1913.

Recommissioned in mid-1914, she was assigned to the 6th Cruiser Squadron of the Grand Fleet at the beginning of World War I. She spent most of the rest of the year searching for German commerce raiders and escorting convoys before she became flagship of the 1st Cruiser Squadron. In early 1915, she was reassigned to the 6th Cruiser Squadron before she became flagship of the North America and West Indies Station, based at the Royal Naval Dockyard in the Imperial fortress colony of Bermuda, in March. Leviathan retained that position for the next three years until she was relieved as flagship in early 1918 and began escorting convoys from North America to Britain. She was placed in reserve in 1919 and sold for scrap in early 1920.

Design and description
Leviathan was designed to displace . The engines were powered by 43 Belleville boilers.

Her main armament consisted of two breech-loading (BL)  Mk X guns in single gun turrets, one each fore and aft of the superstructure. Her secondary armament of sixteen BL 6-inch Mk VII guns was arranged in casemates amidships. Eight of these were mounted on the main deck and were only usable in calm weather. A dozen quick-firing (QF) 12-pounder 12 cwt guns were fitted for defence against torpedo boats. Two additional 12-pounder 8 cwt guns could be dismounted for service ashore. Leviathan also carried three 3-pounder Hotchkiss guns and two submerged  torpedo tubes.

At some point during the way, the ship probably had all of the lower casemates for her six-inch guns plated over and six of them remounted on the upper deck so they could be used in heavy weather. Several twelve-pounders were removed to make room for the six-inch guns.

The armour of the gun turrets and their barbettes was 6 inches thick while the casemate armour was 5 inches thick.

Construction and service

Leviathan, named after the Biblical sea monster, was laid down by John Brown and Company at their shipyard in Clydebank on 30 November 1899. She was launched on 3 July 1901 when she was christened by Lady Inverclyde, wife of George Burns, 2nd Baron Inverclyde, chairman of the Cunard Steamship Company. The ship sailed to Portsmouth for armament and engine tests in March 1902, and was completed on 16 June 1903 when she was initially assigned to the China Station. Transferred to the Mediterranean Fleet in 1905, she was assigned to the 5th Cruiser Squadron after a refit when she returned home at the end of 1906. She was placed in reserve in 1908, but was recommissioned in 1909 for service with the 4th Cruiser Squadron. Leviathan was again placed in reserve in 1913.

On 15 July 1914 she was recommissioned and assigned to the 6th Cruiser Squadron the following day; she participated in the Fleet Review held on 18–20 July at Spithead. The ship was tasked to hunt down German commerce raiders and was sent to the Azores in early August on a false report of German ships operating there. She was then sent to St. Helena to rendezvous with a troop convoy from South Africa. On the return voyage she had engine problems and put into Gibraltar for repairs on 17 September. Beginning on 11 October, she escorted a convoy from Gibraltar to Milford Haven. On 2 December, she was in Cromarty Firth and hoisted the flag of Rear Admiral Archibald Moore, commander of the 1st Cruiser Squadron. Moore struck his flag on 17 January 1915 and transferred to the battlecruiser  at Rosyth and the ship rejoined the 6th Cruiser Squadron. On 9 March, she was unsuccessfully attacked by the German submarine U-12 whilst en route to Rosyth to pick up Vice Admiral George Patey, the new Commander-in-Chief, North America and West Indies Station.

The ship arrived at Bermuda on 26 March; while visiting Halifax, Prince Arthur, Duke of Connaught and Strathearn, Governor General of Canada, came aboard and inspected the ship's crew on 16 June. Patey transferred his flag to her sister ship, on 14 August 1916 while both ships were in Halifax. Vice Admiral Montague Browning relieved Patey and hoisted his flag in the ship on 25 August in Greenock, Scotland. On 8 January 1918, Browning hauled down his flag as he was relieved as commander-in-chief. In March she began escorting convoys from Halifax and New York to the Clyde and Liverpool. She escorted a convoy from New York to Devonport, Devon in November. She was placed in reserve in 1919 and sold for scrap on 3 March 1920 to Hughes Bolckow of Blyth, Northumberland.

Notes

Footnotes

Bibliography

External links

 The ship in the Dreadnought Project

 

Drake-class cruisers
Ships built on the River Clyde
1901 ships
World War I cruisers of the United Kingdom